Bedford Falls Productions (or The Bedford Falls Company) is the production company of Marshall Herskovitz and Edward Zwick, the creators of the television series Thirtysomething and Once and Again, and producers of Legends of the Fall and Blood Diamond. The company is also known for producing the series My So-Called Life, and the Academy Award-winning films Shakespeare in Love and Traffic.

In honor of the 1946 film It's a Wonderful Life; the Bedford Falls Company was named after the fictional town, and an overhead view of a facsimile of the Bailey household appears in the production logo, which also features a couple people singing the last line of "Buffalo Gals" (a song featured in the movie), "...and dance by the light of the moon."

Credits 
 Sawdust (Unsold TV pilot, 1987)
 Thirtysomething (TV series, 1987)
 Extreme Close-Up (TV film, 1990)
 My So-Called Life (TV series, 1994)
 Legends of the Fall (Film, 1994)
 Relativity (TV series, 1996)
 HIStory (Short Film, 1996)
 The Player (1997)
 Astoria (1998)
 Dangerous Beauty (Film, 1998)
 The Siege (Film, 1998)
 Shakespeare in Love (Film, 1998)
 Once and Again (TV series, 1999)
 The Only Living Boy in New York (2000)
 Traffic (Film, 2000)
 I Am Sam (Film, 2001)
 The Poof Point (TV film, 2001)
 Abandon (Film, 2002)
 Lone Star State of Mind (Film, 2002)
 Women vs. Men (2002)
 The Last Samurai (2003)
 1/4life (2005)
 Blood Diamond (Film, 2006)
 Quarterlife (TV-series, 2007)
 Love & Other Drugs (Film, 2010)
 Nashville (TV series, 2016-2018)
 Woman Walks Ahead (Film, 2017)

References 

Film production companies of the United States
Television production companies of the United States
1985 establishments in the United States